The 1988 Chicago Bruisers season was the second season for the Chicago Bruisers. The Bruisers finished 10–1–1 and lost ArenaBowl I to the Detroit Drive.

Regular season

Schedule

Standings

y – clinched regular-season title

x – clinched playoff spot

Playoffs

Roster

Stats

Offense

Passing

Rushing

Receiving

Defense

Special teams

Kick returns

Kicking

Awards

References

Chicago Bruisers seasons
Chicago Bruisers Season, 1988
Chicago Bruisers